Chinese stock market crash may refer to:
 Chinese stock bubble of 2007
 2015–16 Chinese stock market turbulence